Acacia formidabilis is a shrub of the genus Acacia and the subgenus Plurinerves that is endemic to south western Australia.

Description
Like most species of Acacia it has phyllodess rather than true leaves. The evergreen patent to ascending phyllodes have an inequilaterally narrowly elliptic to oblong-lanceolate shape and can be shallowly recurved. It blooms from August to September and produces yellow flowers.

Distribution
It is native to an area in the Wheatbelt and Goldfields regions of Western Australia where it is commonly found in undulating plains and hillsides growing in sandy soils. The shrub has a scattered distribution from around Paynes Find and Perenjori in the north down to around Southern Cross in the south where it is usually a part of tall open shrubland communities.

See also
List of Acacia species

References

formidabilis
Acacias of Western Australia
Taxa named by Bruce Maslin
Plants described in 1999